Surprise, Surprise may refer to:

Music 
 Surprise Surprise (album), a 1982 album by Mezzoforte
 "Surprise Surprise" (Billy Talent song), a 2012 song by Billy Talent from Dead Silence
 "Surprise, Surprise", a song from Bruce Springsteen's album Working on a Dream
 "Surprise, Surprise", a song from Caravan's album For Girls Who Grow Plump in the Night
 "Surprise Surprise", a 2007 song by Celine Dion from Taking Chances
 "Surprise, Surprise", a song from The Rolling Stones' album The Rolling Stones, Now!
 "Surprise, Surprise (Sweet Bird of Paradox)", a song from John Lennon's album Walls and Bridges

Television 
 Surprise Surprise (British TV series), a British light entertainment programme
 Surprise Surprise (Australian TV series), an Australian hidden camera show
Surprise! Surprise! (1972 TV series), an Australian television series
 Surprise Sur Prise, a Canadian TV show
 "Surprise, Surprise" (As Time Goes By), an episode of the British sitcom As Time Goes By

Other uses 
 Surprise Surprise (film), a 2009 short film
 Surprise! Surprise! (short story collection), a 1966 series of twelve short stories by Agatha Christie

See also 
 Surprise Surprise Gotcha, an Australian television series
 Surprise Surprise Surprise, an album by Miracle Legion
 Surprise Supplies, a live album by Caravan
 Surprise (disambiguation)

English phrases